Wang Zhengxin (1899–?), also romanised as Wang Tsen-sing, was a Chinese actor active from 1926 to 1937 in the cinema of Shanghai. He was either from Shandong or of Shandong descent.

His film career ended in 1937 when Japan bombed Shanghai at the start of the Second Sino-Japanese War. He fled to Sichuan or Chongqing, and later went to Kunming to become the deputy manager of Nanping Theatre (南屏大戲院). After the war ended in 1945, he returned to Shanghai and probably worked again in a theater or cinema. His life after that is unknown.

Filmography

References

External links

20th-century Chinese male actors
Chinese male film actors
Male actors from Shandong
1899 births
Chinese male silent film actors
Year of death missing